NGC 406 is a spiral galaxy quite similar to the well known Whirlpool Galaxy, located some 65 million light-years away, in the southern constellation of Tucana (the Toucan) and discovered in 1834 by John Herschel. It is described in the New General Catalogue as "faint, very large, round, very gradually a little brighter middle". NGC 406 is about  light-years across, roughly half the diameter of the Milky Way.

Gallery

References

External links 
 
 A Cosmic Whirlpool in Tucana — ESA/Hubble Picture of the week
 SIMBAD search results for NGC 406

Tucana (constellation)
0406
Unbarred spiral galaxies
18351103
Discoveries by John Herschel
003980